Saundra Graham is an American independent politician from Cambridge, Massachusetts. She served as a Cambridge City Councilor from 1971 to 1989, and represented the 4th Middlesex district in the Massachusetts House of Representatives from 1977 to 1988.

In 1968, Graham became a member of the Cambridge Community Center’s board of directors. Two years later, she was chosen as president of the Riverside Planning Team, a group of housing activists in the Cambridge neighborhood of Riverside. In 1970, the Riverside Planning Team interrupted Harvard's commencement ceremony, and Graham stormed the stage and demanded that the university dedicate land in Riverside which had been set aside for a planned dorm to low-income housing. Members of the Harvard Corporation met with Graham and the activists, and after several hours they reached an agreement in which the university would build low-income housing on a different site. The following year, Graham was elected the first African-American woman on the Cambridge City Council, and she went on to become the first Black woman to represent Cambridge in the state legislature.

References

20th-century American women politicians
African-American city council members in Massachusetts
African-American state legislators in Massachusetts
Members of the Massachusetts House of Representatives
People from Cambridge, Massachusetts
Women city councillors in Massachusetts
Women state legislators in Massachusetts
Year of birth missing
Year of death missing
20th-century African-American women
20th-century African-American politicians
20th-century American politicians